It's for Your Own Good may refer to:

 It's for Your Own Good (EP), by Australian rock band, The Living End
 It's for Your Own Good (film), Spanish film